Heikki Savolainen may refer to:

Heikki Savolainen (gymnast) (1907–1997), Finnish Olympic gymnast
Heikki Savolainen (actor) (1922–1975), Finnish actor